Trichocanonura linearis is a species of longhorn beetles of the subfamily Lamiinae, and the only species in the genus Trichocanonura. It was described by Skinner in 1905.

References

Acanthocinini
Beetles described in 1905
Monotypic beetle genera